Grant Albert Wacker (born 1945) is an American historian of Christianity in the United States.

Education 
Wacker is a graduate of Stanford University (BA, philosophy) and of Harvard University (PhD, religion).

Career 
Grant Wacker is the Gilbert T. Rowe Distinguished Professor Emeritus of Christian History at Duke Divinity School. He taught in the Department of Religious Studies at the University of North Carolina at Chapel Hill from 1977 to 1992. In 1992 he moved to Duke Divinity School. He partly retired in 2015 and fully retired in 2020.  He is the author, co-author, or co-editor of eight books, including Heaven Below: Early Pentecostals and American Culture (2001) and America's Pastor: Billy Graham and the Shaping of a Nation (2014), both published by Harvard University Press, and One Soul at a Time: The Story of Billy Graham (Eerdmans, 2019). Winner of two distinguished teaching awards, Wacker has authored more than thirty journal articles and book chapters, over one hundred book reviews, and numerous op-eds and essays in general and in religious magazines and newspapers. He is past president of the Society for Pentecostal Studies, past president of the American Society of Church History, and a former senior editor of Church History: Studies in Christianity and Culture. He is an advisory editor of The Christian Century and Religion and American Culture. From 2010 to 2021 he has served as a trustee of Fuller Theological Seminary.

Personal life 
Wacker lives with his wife Katherine in Cary, North Carolina. They are active members of a local United Methodist Church.

References

External links 
 An interview with Grant Wacker

1945 births
American historians of religion
American United Methodists
Duke Divinity School faculty
Harvard Divinity School alumni
Living people
Methodist scholars
Presidents of the American Society of Church History
Stanford University alumni
University of North Carolina at Chapel Hill faculty